"I've Got So Much to Give" is an R&B contemporary romantic ballad composed and recorded by popular soul artist Barry White and released in 1973. It was originally conceived by White as a single but then featured on the album of the same name (released in 1973), that peaked at number one on the Hot R&B Albums Chart.

Song information
Barry White composed and arranged both the instrumentals and the vocals.

The song begins with a brief instrumental solo performed by The Love Unlimited Orchestra, the instrumentals are repeated while White speaks romantic words to his apparent love interest, this style is also used in his version of "Just the Way You Are" and Barry's other contemporary ballads. White then begins the song's first verse, after completing his vocals he repeats the title as a chorus. The song then ends with an extended instrumental set consisting of a flute, drums, violin, a bass guitar, and White's own piano playing as White continues to speak romantic words and later improvising vocals towards the end of the song. The song ends with a fade similar to traditional ballads of the same type.

Influence and reception
The romantic lyrics used in the song helped craft White's sexual persona, and the unusual orchestral combination of instruments in an R&B song influenced the disco sound along with White's other mainly instrumental songs. I've Got So Much To Give was heavily acclaimed by Allmusic who felt it was obvious why the album reached the top of the R&B charts, despite the fact I've Got So Much To Give followed a formula similar to White's past songs they stated "the novelty of White's approach, coupled with the universality of his subject matter, ensured that there was no sense of having heard it all before." In a play written by Mark Frank (included in the book A Collection of Plays Written by Mark Frank), one of the main protagonist transforms himself into Barry White and performs the song. The song is often used in romantic novels and films.

Credits
Arrangements by Gene Page and Barry White
Composition and vocals by Barry White
Instrumentals and background vocals performed by The Love Unlimited Orchestra

Chart performance
The song peaked at number 32 on the Billboard Hot 100 chart and charted for 11 weeks. It also reached number five on the US Billboard R&B chart and #46 Adult Contemporary.

References

1973 singles
Barry White songs
Songs written by Barry White
1973 songs
20th Century Fox Records singles